Thomas Hoyt Brown (April 3, 1839June 19, 1908) was an American businessman and Republican politician.  He was the 25th and 28th mayor of Milwaukee, Wisconsin, and was the first mayor of Milwaukee born in Milwaukee.

Background
Thomas H. Brown was born in Milwaukee on April 3, 1839.

He died at his home in Milwaukee on June 19, 1908.

Career
Brown served as an alderman and President of the Milwaukee Common Council before serving as Mayor from 1880 to 1882.

In 1888, merchant and former alderman Herman Kroeger ran for Mayor of Milwaukee as a Union Labor candidate advocating public ownership of municipal improvements, the establishment of public baths and a law permitting the recall of city officials. He was taken so seriously that the Republicans and Democrats united to run Brown as a fusion candidate against him. He was nearly elected anyway, with 15,033 votes to 15,978 for Brown. Radical Socialist Labor candidate Colin Campbell, backed by Paul Grottkau (imprisoned editor of the Arbeiter Zeitung) garnered 964 votes, just enough to keep Kroeger from winning if they’d gone to him instead.

Brown was a Republican. He is interred in Forest Home Cemetery in Milwaukee.

References

External links
 

Milwaukee Common Council members
Mayors of Milwaukee
Wisconsin Republicans
1839 births
1908 deaths
19th-century American politicians